The 2010 Tri Nations Indoor Netball Series took place 12–21 March 2010 in Sun City, South Africa.

Host selection
The Tri Nations was awarded to South Africa by the WINA at the conclusion of the previous World Cup.

Venue
Action Sports SA determined that the Rustenburg Action Sports Centre in Rustenburg would host all Tri Nations matches and Rustenburg became the host city as a result.

Media coverage

Television
Supersport has arranged for limited delayed telecast of the finals series on SuperSport in South Africa. This show will repeat numerous times during the month of April.

Online coverage
Action Sports SA provided online coverage of the results on the official Action Sport SA Website.

A number of players, officials and spectators also provided coverage for friends and members of the public via social networking sites such as Facebook and Twitter.

Participants
Men's Division
  Australia
  England
  South Africa
  South Africa Invitation

Women's Division
  Australia
  England
  South Africa
  South Africa Invitation

Mixed Division
  Australia
  England
  South Africa
  South Africa Invitation

21 and Under Division
  Australia
  England
  South Africa
  South Africa Invitation

New Zealand were also entered but withdraw just a few months before the commencement of the tournament. South African Invitation were replacements for the New Zealand teams

Round robin tournament

Day One (6-a-side)

Men's Division

Ladder at conclusion of Day One

Women's Division

Ladder at conclusion of Day One

Mixed Division

Ladder at conclusion of Day One

21 and Under Division

Ladder at conclusion of Day One

Day Two (6-a-side)

The evening session on was ticketed and in keeping with the theme of "Aussie Juniors Night" featured few matches from the open divisions and instead focused on the simultaneously run 2009 Junior World Series of Indoor Cricket. Most open matches therefore took place whilst free entry to the venue was permitted.

Men's Division

Ladder at conclusion of Day Two

Women's Division

Ladder at conclusion of Day Two

Mixed Division

Ladder at conclusion of Day Two

21 and Under Division

Ladder at conclusion of Day Two

Day Three (Semi-finals)

Day three of the tournament featured all of the semi finals from all the 6-a-side divisions and a semi final is played between second place and third place.

Men's Division

A: Semi-final (2v3)

Women's Division

A: Semi-final (2v3)

Mixed Division

A: Semi-final (2v3)

21 and Under Division

A: Semi-final (2v3)

Day Three (Finals)

Men's Division

A: Final (1 v winner)

Women's Division

A: Final (1 v winner)

Mixed Division

A: Final (1 v winner)

21 and Under Division

A: Final (1 v winner)

Day Four (7-a-side)

Men's Division

Ladder at conclusion of Day Four

Women's Division

Ladder at conclusion of Day Four

Mixed Division

Ladder at conclusion of Day Four

21 and Under Division

Ladder at conclusion of Day Four

Day Five (7-a-side)

Men's Division

Ladder at conclusion of Day Two

Women's Division

Ladder at conclusion of Day Two

Mixed Division

Ladder at conclusion of Day Two

21 and Under Division

Ladder at conclusion of Day Two

Day Three (Semi-finals)

Day three of the tournament featured all of the semi finals from all the 6-a-side divisions and a semi final is played between second place and third place.

Men's Division

A: Semi-final (2v3)

Women's Division

A: Semi-final (2v3)

Mixed Division

A: Semi-final (2v3)

21 and Under Division

A: Semi-final (2v3)

Day Three (Finals)

Men's Division

A: Final (1 v winner)

Women's Division

A: Final (1 v winner)

Mixed Division

A: Final (1 v winner)

21 and Under Division

A: Final (1 v winner)

Notes

International netball competitions hosted by South Africa
2010 in netball
2010 in South African women's sport
2010 in Australian netball
2010 in English netball